Lac Chauvet is a lake in Picherande, Puy-de-Dôme, France. At an elevation of 1176 m, its surface area is 0.54 km².

References

External links

Chauvet
Chauvet
Landforms of Auvergne-Rhône-Alpes